The South Eastern Health and Social Care Trust (SEHSCT) is a health organisation in Northern Ireland. Hospitals served by the Trust include Downe Hospital, Lagan Valley Hospital and Ulster Hospital.  It has 14,000 employees and 800 patient beds. It has created a comprehensive electronic record system and uses a fleet of mobile medical carts supplied by Ergotron which are said to have improved the quality of nurses’ daily ward rounds.

History
The trust was established as the South Eastern Health and Social Services Trust on 1 August 2006, and became operational on 1 April 2007. In July 2021, the trust announced the appointment of Roisin Coulter as its next chief executive.

Performance
In April 2022 there were 4,513 children who had been waiting a year or more for a first consultant led outpatient appointment.

Population
The area covered by South Eastern Health and Social Care Trust has a population of 346,911 residents according to the 2011 Northern Ireland census.

References

External links